Finland originally planned to participate in the Eurovision Song Contest 2020 with the song "Looking Back" written by Joonas Angeria, Whitney Phillips, Connor McDonough, Riley McDonough and Toby McDonough. The song was performed by Aksel Kankaanranta. The Finnish broadcaster  (Yle) organised the national final  in order to select the Finnish entry for the 2020 contest in Rotterdam, Netherlands. Six entries were selected to compete in the national final on 7 March 2020 where the 50/50 combination of votes from eight international jury groups and votes from the public selected "Looking Back" performed by Aksel Kankaanranta as the winner.

Finland was drawn to compete in the second semi-final of the Eurovision Song Contest which took place on 14 May 2020. However, the contest was cancelled due to the COVID-19 pandemic.

Background 
Prior to the 2020 Contest, Finland had participated in the Eurovision Song Contest fifty-three times since its first entry in 1961. Finland has won the contest once in 2006 with the song "Hard Rock Hallelujah" performed by Lordi. In the 2019 contest, "Look Away" performed by Darude featuring Sebastian Rejman failed to qualify Finland to the final, placing seventeenth (last) in the semi-final.

The Finnish national broadcaster,  (Yle), broadcasts the event within Finland and organises the selection process for the nation's entry. Yle confirmed their intentions to participate at the 2019 Eurovision Song Contest on 3 June 2019. Finland's entries for the Eurovision Song Contest have been selected through national final competitions that have varied in format over the years. Between 1961 and 2011, a selection show that was often titled  highlighted that the purpose of the program was to select a song for Eurovision. However, since 2012, the broadcaster has organised the selection show  (UMK), which focuses on showcasing new music with the winning song being selected as the Finnish contest entry for that year. Along with their participation confirmation, the broadcaster also announced that the Finnish entry for the 2020 contest would be selected through , reverting to an open selection with multiple artists and songs; Yle opted to internally select the artist with the song selected through Uuden Musiikin Kilpailu in 2018 and 2019.

Before Eurovision

Uuden Musiikin Kilpailu 2020
The competition consisted of a final on 7 March 2020, held at the Mediapolis in Tampere and hosted by 2013 Finnish Eurovision entrant Krista Siegfrids with YleX hosts Viki and Köpi hosting from the green room. The competition was watched by 885,000 viewers in Finland.

Competing entries 
A submission period was opened by Yle which lasted between 1 November 2019 and 8 November 2019. At least one of the writers and the lead singer(s) had to hold Finnish citizenship or live in Finland permanently in order for the entry to qualify to compete. A panel of ten experts appointed by Yle selected six entries for the competition from the 426 received submissions. The experts were Tapio Hakanen (Head of Music at YleX), Anssi Autio (UMK producer), Juha-Matti Valtonen (television director), Reija Wäre (choreographer), Samuli Väänänen (Senior Editor at Spotify Finland), Perttu Mäkelä (A&R manager at Etenee Records), Ida Karimaa (music journalist at YleX), Katri Norrlin (music journalist at YleX), Johan Lindroos (Head of Music at Yle Radio Suomi) and Amie Borgar (Head of Music at ). The competing entries were presented during a live streamed press conference on 21 January 2020, hosted by Krista Siegfrids and Mikko Silvennoinen, while their lyric videos were released between 24 and 31 January 2020.

Final 
The final took place on 7 March 2020 where six entries competed. "Looking Back" performed by Aksel Kankaanranta was selected as the winner by a 50/50 combination of public votes and eight international jury groups from Bulgaria, Estonia, Germany, Netherlands, Sweden, Spain, Russia and the United Kingdom. The viewers and the juries each had a total of 320 points to award. Each jury group distributed their points as follows: 4, 6, 8, 10 and 12 points. The viewer vote was based on the percentage of votes each song achieved through the following voting methods: telephone, SMS and app voting. For example, if a song gained 10% of the viewer vote, then that entry would be awarded 10% of 320 points rounded to the nearest integer: 32 points. A total of 114,664 votes were cast during the show. In addition to the performances of the competing entries, the interval act featured Behm performing her song "" and Mikael Gabriel performing his single "".

At Eurovision 
According to Eurovision rules, all nations with the exceptions of the host country and the "Big Five" (France, Germany, Italy, Spain and the United Kingdom) are required to qualify from one of two semi-finals in order to compete for the final; the top ten countries from each semi-final progress to the final. The European Broadcasting Union (EBU) split up the competing countries into six different pots based on voting patterns from previous contests, with countries with favourable voting histories put into the same pot. On 28 January 2020, a special allocation draw was held which placed each country into one of the two semi-finals, as well as which half of the show they would perform in. Finland was placed into the second semi-final, to be held on 14 May 2020, and was scheduled to perform in the second half of the show. However, due to 2019-20 pandemic of Coronavirus, the contest was cancelled.

During the Eurovision Song Celebration YouTube broadcast in place of the semi-finals, it was revealed that Finland was set to perform in position 13, following the entry from Albania and before the entry from Armenia.

References

External links 
Official Yle Eurovision site
Official Uuden Musiikin Kilpailu 2020 site

2020
Countries in the Eurovision Song Contest 2020
Eurovision
Eurovision